Maggie Nelson (born 1973) is an American writer. She has been described as a genre-busting writer defying classification, working in autobiography, art criticism, theory, feminism, queerness, sexual violence, the history of the avant-garde, aesthetic theory, philosophy, scholarship, and poetry. Nelson has been the recipient of a 2016 MacArthur Fellowship, a 2012 Creative Capital Literature Fellowship, a 2011 NEA Fellowship in Poetry, and a 2010 Guggenheim Fellowship in Nonfiction. Other honors include the 2015 National Book Critics Circle Award in Criticism and a 2007 Andy Warhol Foundation/Creative Capital Arts Writers Grant.

Life and career 
Nelson was born in 1973, the second daughter of Bruce and Barbara Nelson. She grew up in Marin County, California. Her parents divorced when she was eight after her mother fell in love with their house painter. In 1984, Nelson's father died of a heart attack.

She moved to Connecticut in 1990 to study English at Wesleyan University where she was taught by Annie Dillard. After college, she lived in New York City where she trained as a dancer, worked at the Poetry Project at St. Mark's Church, and studied informally with writer Eileen Myles. In 1998, she enrolled in a graduate program, obtaining a Ph.D. in English literature in 2004 at the CUNY Graduate Center. At CUNY, Nelson studied with Wayne Koestenbaum and Eve Sedgewick, among others. She left New York in 2005 to take up a teaching job at the California Institute of the Arts.

Nelson is the author of several books of nonfiction and poetry. She also writes frequently on art, including essays on artists Sarah Lucas, Matthew Barney, Carolee Schneemann, A. L. Steiner, Kara Walker, and Rachel Harrison.

Nelson has taught about writing, critical theory, art, aesthetics, and literature, at the graduate writing program of the New School, Wesleyan University, Pratt Institute of Arts, and CalArts. , she was a professor of English at the University of Southern California.

Nelson is married to the artist Harry Dodge, who is fluidly gendered. They live with their family in Los Angeles.

Books 

The Argonauts (2015) won the National Book Critics Circle Award in Criticism and was a New York Times best-seller. It is a work of "autotheory", offering thinking about desire, identity, family-making, and the limitations and possibilities of love and language. In the memoir, Nelson documents the changes in her body throughout pregnancy with her son, Iggy, and that of Harry Dodge's body, as he takes testosterone and undergoes chest reconstruction ('top surgery'). Nelson has described it as reflecting 20 years of living with and learning from feminist and queer theory.

The Art of Cruelty (2011), a work of cultural, art, and literary criticism, was featured on the front cover of the Sunday Book Review of the New York Times and was named a New York Times Notable Book of the Year. The book covers a wide range of topics, from Sylvia Plath's poetry to Francis Bacon's paintings, from the Saw franchise to Yoko Ono's performance art, and offers a model of how one might balance strong ethical convictions with an equally strong appreciation for work that tests the limits of taste, taboo, and permissibility. Bluets (2009) is an unclassifiable book of prose written in numbered segments that deals with pain, pleasure, heartbreak, and the consolations of philosophy, all through the lens of the color blue. It quickly became a cult classic, and was named by Bookforum as one of the 10 best books of the past 20 years.

Women, the New York School, and Other True Abstractions (2007) is a scholarly book about gender and abstract expressionism from the 1950s through the 1980s. It focuses on the work of painter Joan Mitchell, poets Barbara Guest, John Ashbery, James Schuyler, Frank O'Hara, and poets Bernadette Mayer, Alice Notley, and Eileen Myles. In 2008 the book was awarded the Susanne M. Glasscock Award for Interdisciplinary Scholarship.

The Red Parts (2007) and Jane: A Murder (2005) both contend with the murder of Nelson's aunt Jane near Ann Arbor, Michigan, in 1969. Jane: A Murder (2005) explores the nature of this haunting incident via a collage of poetry, prose, dream-accounts, and documentary sources, including local and national newspapers, related "true crime" books, and fragments from Jane's own diaries. Part elegy, part memoir, detective story, part meditation on sexual violence, and part conversation between the living and the dead, Jane is widely recognized as having expanded the notion of what poetry can do—what kind of stories it can tell, and how it can tell them. It was a finalist for the PEN / Martha Albrand Award for the Art of the Memoir.

The Red Parts: Autobiography of a Trial (2007) picks up where Jane left off, offering a prose account of the trial of a new suspect in Jane's murder 36 years after the fact. Written in plain, trenchant prose reminiscent of Joan Didion, The Red Parts is a coming of age story, a documentary account of a trial, and a provocative essay interrogating the American obsession with violence and missing white women, and the nature of grief, justice, and empathy.

Nelson's collections of poetry include Something Bright, Then Holes (2007), The Latest Winter (2003), and Shiner (2001).

Awards and honors 
2007 Arts Writers grant from Creative Capital and Andy Warhol Foundation for the Visual Arts.
W.2011 National Endowment for the Arts Fellowship for Poetry.
2015 New York Times Notable Book, The Argonauts.
2015 National Book Critics Circle Award (Criticism), winner for Argonauts. 
2016 MacArthur Fellowship, writer.

Bibliography 
Shiner (Hanging Loose Press, 2001). 
The Latest Winter (Hanging Loose Press, 2003). 
Jane: A Murder (Soft Skull, 2005). 
The Red Parts: A Memoir (Free Press, 2007). 
Something Bright, Then Holes (Soft Skull, 2007). 
Women, the New York School, and Other True Abstractions (University of Iowa Press, 2007). 
Bluets (Wave Books, 2009). 
The Art of Cruelty: A Reckoning (W. W. Norton & Company, 2011). 
The Argonauts (Graywolf Press, 2015). 
On Freedom - Four Songs of Care and Constraint (Graywolf Press, 2021).

References

External links 

New York Times review of The Art of Cruelty
Audio: Maggie Nelson at the Key West Literary Seminar, 2008: reading from "Something Bright, Then Holes"
Audio: Maggie Nelson at the Key West Literary Seminar, 2008: reading from Jane: A Murder and The Red Parts: A Memoir
An interview with Maggie Nelson about creativity
Maggie Nelson's Author page at W. W. Norton & Company
Maggie Nelson's Author page at Wave Books
A review of Women, the New York School, and Other True Abstractions
Maggie Nelson on PennSound
Maggie Nelson's page at CalArts
Maggie Nelson by AL Steiner Bomb

21st-century American poets
Living people
Wesleyan University faculty
American women poets
21st-century American women writers
Place of birth missing (living people)
1973 births
Graduate Center, CUNY alumni
National Endowment for the Arts Fellows
The New School faculty
Pratt Institute faculty
California Institute of the Arts faculty
American women academics